Olli Kiiskinen (15 August 1875 – 5 July 1943) was a Finnish farmer and politician, born in Kerimäki. He was a Member of the Parliament of Finland from 1909 to 1910, representing the Agrarian League.

References

1875 births
1943 deaths
People from Kerimäki
People from Mikkeli Province (Grand Duchy of Finland)
Centre Party (Finland) politicians
Members of the Parliament of Finland (1909–10)